Fontana Dam (also known as Fontana Village) is a town in Graham County, North Carolina, United States. Fontana Dam is located on North Carolina Highway 28 near the Fontana Dam and the Little Tennessee River. The town incorporated in 2011 and has a full-time population of 33.

History

The town is based around the village built to support the dam construction from 1942 to 1944, so that the dam could produce electricity to power the ALCOA (Aluminum Company Of America) in nearby Alcoa, Tennessee which is south of Knoxville. The company was producing aluminum to make military aircraft during World War II. The cottages now rented out for visitors were employee houses. The dining hall is now a cafeteria and the commissary is now the village store. The old lodge was once a hospital and a school was also on the grounds. The children who grew up there during the dam construction times now have an association called "Dam Kids" and they keep in touch and have reunions.

The property was transferred to Guest Services of America (GSA) then sold to Peppertree Corporation of Asheville NC in 1987. The CEO, Wayne Kinzer was later convicted of a felony and the property changed hands several times thereafter. Police services were once handled by village company police of the resort, but with Kinzer's felony conviction, the agency disbanded. The TVA police also patrolled the property which was part of a 100-year ground lease from TVA. With the disbanding of TVA police in 2012, the Graham County Sheriff Department and the NC Highway Patrol are the only police services to the area now.

Incorporation
Fontana Dam incorporated as a Town in June 2011.

Demographics

Economy
The town's main employer is the Fontana Village Resort, which serves 100,000 visitors annually. Fontana Dam has a post office with ZIP code 28733. In addition to residents and resort guests, the post office also serves hikers on the Appalachian Trail, which crosses the Fontana Dam; it is the first post office on the trail north of its southern end in Georgia. The Fontana Dam post office was one of several scheduled to be closed in 2011, though the closings have since been postponed.

References

Towns in Graham County, North Carolina
Towns in North Carolina
Communities of the Great Smoky Mountains